Jan van der Hoeve (13 April 1878 in Santpoort – 26 April 1952 in Leiden) was a Dutch ophthalmologist. He is recognised for his concept of the phakomatoses, often called neurocutaneous syndromes.

Van der Hoeve graduated from the University of Leiden and received his doctorate at the University of Bern. He became a professor of ophthalmology at the University of Groningen and later at the University of Leiden. Van der Hoeve became a member of the Royal Netherlands Academy of Arts and Sciences in 1923. He was elected president of the Physical Section of the institute in 1932.

Van der Hoeve made one of the earliest descriptions of Waardenburg syndrome, in 1916.

Papers

See also
Timeline of tuberous sclerosis

References

1878 births
1952 deaths
Dutch ophthalmologists
Leiden University alumni
University of Bern alumni
Academic staff of the University of Groningen
Academic staff of Leiden University
People from Velsen
Members of the Royal Netherlands Academy of Arts and Sciences